Kevin Swindell (born February 21, 1989) is an American racing driver, who has competed in USAC and NASCAR competition. He has won 77 races in various dirt racing series including the Chili Bowl Nationals. Swindell is the son of three time World of Outlaws Sprint Car champion Sammy Swindell.

Racing career

Early career
Swindell began his racing career at age 5 in go-karts in Memphis, Tennessee, finishing an impressive fourth in his Junior Novice kart series debut in 1995. He moved up to Jr. I after winning four races in six starts. He had the same result in 1997 there, four wins in six starts. In 1998, he won a 30-lap Iron Man race at Memphis and won four of five races in Jr. I karting in 2000. Swindell was the 2001 Jr. II kart champion in indoor karting and won the first champ kart race ever held on dirt. He even won the first ever champ kart race ran on pavement in 2002 and won the World Karting Association Grand National Championship title as well as winning his 2nd consecutive Tulsa Shootout Jr. II championship.

Dirt career
Swindell made his impressive debut in dirt racing in 1999 when he won four quarter midget national victories. He won two more races in the Tulsa Quarter Midget series in 2000. He then leaped into the USAC and World of Outlaws world in 2002, the same series where his father, Sammy Swindell, made a name for himself. There, he got back-to-back victories in both series in the 600 Mini-Sprints at Granite City, Illinois, in 2003, showing that he was going to make a name for himself as well. In 2004, he won two World of Outlaws sprint car races as a crew chief to his father Sammy. He made World of Outlaws history in 2005 when he became the youngest driver to ever finish in the top 10 in a feature event at 15, finishing 6th at Paramatta. He even set two new track qualifying records in the USCS series as well and finish 20th in his first season in WoO Sprint Cars.

In 2006, Swindell won his first career WoO feature event at the Lowe's Dirt Track, becoming the youngest winner in World of Outlaws history at 17. In 2007, Swindell teamed with NASCAR driver Kasey Kahne to run the full USAC midget and sprint car schedule and finished 6th and 8th in points in both series respectively. He was the Western World champion in the USAC series at Manzanita in 2008. In 2009, Swindell won the USAC Knoxville Nationals and the Louis Vermeil Classic and was the Australian National Midget Champion. In 2010, Swindell won his first Chili Bowl Nationals victory and became the youngest driver to ever do so. He won it again in 2011 and won the All-Star sprint 140 feature at Knoxville. He finished 3rd in points and was crowned Rookie of the Year. In 2012, Swindell won his third consecutive Chili Bowl Nationals and was runner-up in the Knoxville 360 Nationals. Swindell made USAC history in January 2013 when he became the first driver to ever win four consecutive Chili Bowl Nationals.

Stock car career
In 2006, Swindell made his debut in stock car racing in the ARCA Racing Series event at Salem, finishing 14th. He ran three more races that year with a best of 11th at Toledo. In 2008, Swindell made his NASCAR debut running two K&N Pro Series East races at Mansfield and Stafford Springs, finishing 13th and 16th in those events. In 2009, he ran three more races in the series with a best of 3rd at Loudon, his first career NASCAR top five finish. In 2010, Swindell ran the full schedule scoring two poles, one top 5 and 4 top tens and finishing 7th in the points. He also ran an ARCA race at Rockingham where he won the pole and led the most laps but finished 2nd. He made his NASCAR Nationwide Series debut at New Hampshire driving for Baker Curb Racing, but start and parked and finished 42nd. Swindell also ran two more events that year but had DNF's in those as well.

In 2011, Swindell drove the No. 16 Ford for Roush Fenway Racing in the Nationwide race at Dover filling in for the ill Trevor Bayne at the time, qualified an impressive 5th and ran very well until being taken out nearly halfway in a controversial incident with Alex Kennedy; after an accident, Kennedy pulled across the racetrack while attempting to rejoin the field, leaving Swindell with nowhere to go and triggering a major accident; Swindell wound up finishing 31st. Swindell also ran one ARCA race at Daytona, starting and finishing 12th.

In 2012, Swindell ran 8 ARCA Racing Series events and won his first career ARCA victory at Chicagoland Speedway, leading every single lap from the pole. He finished a career best 22nd in points that season. He also ran two NASCAR Nationwide Series events with Biagi-DenBeste Racing late in the season, finishing ninth at Texas Motor Speedway, his first career top-ten finish, and finishing 21st in the season finale at Homestead-Miami Speedway. For 2013, he signed with Biagi-DenBeste Racing to run 15 races in the Nationwide Series, competing for Rookie of the Year. In September, it was announced that Swindell would compete in the Sprint Cup Series for Swan Racing, at New Hampshire Motor Speedway; he finished 38th in the event.

On August 13, 2014, Venturini Motorsports announced that Swindell would replace the injured John Wes Townley in the No. 15 Toyota at the Springfield Mile's ARCA race; Swindell won the event, his second win in the series.

Other racing
Swindell has also raced in Australia, winning the 2008/09 Australian Speedcar Championship at the Murray Bridge Speedway (in Australia, Midgets are called Speedcars).

2015 Knoxville Nationals accident
On Thursday August 13 2015, Swindell was involved in a very serious accident in the early laps of a heat race during night two of the 55th annual Knoxville Nationals. His car flipped several times before landing on its wheels. He sustained a "significant injury" according to his father and former sprint car driver Sammy Swindell. It was later revealed that he had broken the L-1 and T-7 vertebrae in his back and was paralyzed from the waist down.

In October 2015, Swindell spoke with Robin Miller about the progress in his recovery, including having regained some feeling and movement in his legs.

Motorsports career results

NASCAR
(key) (Bold – Pole position awarded by qualifying time. Italics – Pole position earned by points standings or practice time. * – Most laps led.)

Sprint Cup Series

Nationwide Series

K&N Pro Series East

ARCA Racing Series
(key) (Bold – Pole position awarded by qualifying time. Italics – Pole position earned by points standings or practice time. * – Most laps led. ** – All laps led.)

 Season still in progress 
 Ineligible for series championship points

References

External links
 
 

Living people
1989 births
People from Germantown, Tennessee
Racing drivers from Tennessee
NASCAR drivers
ARCA Menards Series drivers
People from Concord, North Carolina
Evernham Motorsports drivers
RFK Racing drivers
USAC Silver Crown Series drivers
World of Outlaws drivers